Cold Steel may refer to:

 Cold-formed steel (CFS), the common term for products made by rolling or pressing thin gauges of sheet steel into goods
 Cold Steel (company), marketer of knives, swords and other edged weapons and tools

Media 
 Cold Steel (1921 film), an American silent film directed by Sherwood MacDonald
 Cold Steel (1987 film), an American thriller film directed by Dorothy Ann Puzo
 Cold Steel (2011 film), a Chinese action film directed by David Wu
 Cold Steel, a 2013 novel in Kate Elliott's Spiritwalker trilogy
 The Legend of Heroes: Trails of Cold Steel, a video game series